The Russell Affair is a 1928 Australian silent film directed by P. J. Ramster. It was Ramster's last film.

Synopsis
An artist, Stephen Patrick, falls in love with his model, Juliette (Adrienne Stewart). Juliette is in love with Dr Lonsdale, who is engaged to a wealthy widow, Ruby Russsell (Jessica Harcourt). Ruby destroys Patrick's paintings of Juliette in a jealous rage, but manages to get Juliette blamed. A blackmailer, Arthur White (Gaston Mervale), complicates things.

Production
The movie was financed partly by Juliette De La Ruze, a woman anxious to get involved in film production. Filming took place in Sydney, partly at the studios of Australasian Films, Hyde Park and "in the homes of prominent society people and wound up in August 1928.

The star, Jessica Harcourt, previously appeared in the expensive silent productions, For the Term of His Natural Life (1927) and The Adorable Outcast (1928) and was also well known as a fashion model. She made no further films.

No copy exists today and it is considered a lost film.

Cast
Jessica Harcourt as Ruby Russell
Gaston Mervale as Arthur White
Adrienne Stewart as Juliette Hope
Arthur McLaglen
Fred Twitcham
Arthur Clarke
Robert Purdie
Roy Paine

References

External links

1928 films
Australian drama films
Australian silent films
Australian black-and-white films
1928 drama films
Lost Australian films
1928 lost films
Lost drama films
Silent drama films
1920s English-language films